General elections were held in Barbados on 13 December 1951, the first held under universal suffrage. The result was a victory for the Barbados Labour Party, which won 15 of the 24 seats. Voter turnout was 64.6%. Edna Ermyntrude Bourne, elected in the Parish of St. Andrew, became the island's first female member of the House of Assembly.
 
At the time of the election, Barbados did not have a formal ministerial government. This was established on 1 February 1954, when Grantley Herbert Adams became the first Premier.

Results

References

Barbados
1951 in Barbados
Elections in Barbados
December 1951 events in North America